John Knill or Acknyll (by 1519 – 1561 or 1564), of Knill, Herefordshire and Old Radnor Burlingjobb, Radnorshire, was an English member of parliament.

He was a Member (MP) of the Parliament of England for Radnorshire in 1545 and November 1554.

References

1560s deaths
People from Radnorshire
People from Herefordshire
English MPs 1545–1547
English MPs 1554–1555
Year of birth uncertain